PBA Tour Bowling 2001 is a 2000 bowling sports-based video game developed and published by Bethesda Softworks. The game is licensed by the Professional Bowlers Association.

Development
The game was announced in May 2000 for the Sega Dreamcast.The PC version of the game went gold in November 2000.

Reception

IGN rated the game a 5.6 out of 10 stating"Granted, that's more than a certain predecessor can claim, but as the situation stands, it ain't a ballsy enough proposition to convince enthusiastic bowlers to part with their precious pesos"

References

2000 video games
Bethesda Softworks games
Bowling video games
Dreamcast games
Professional Bowlers Association
Video games developed in the United States
Windows games